The International Bosphorus Cup is a Group 2 flat horse race in Turkey open to horses aged three years or older. It is run at Veliefendi Race Course over a distance of 2,400 metres (about 1½ mile), and it is scheduled to take place each year in early September. It is part of Istanbul's International Racing Festival.

History
The Bosphorus Cup was elevated to international Group 2 level in 2009, though in 2018 it lost that status becoming Local Group 2 and substantially reducing its prizemoney.

Records since 2000
Most successful horse (2 wins):
 Grand Ekinoks – (2002), (2003)
 Senex – (2004), (2005)
 Indian Days – (2010), (2011)

Leading jockey (3 wins):
 Alan Munro – Halicarnassus (2009), Indian Days (2010), (2011)

Leading trainer (3 wins):
 Hans Blume – Senex (2004), (2005), Bussoni (2007)
 Saeed bin Suroor - Lost in the Moment (2013), Move Up (2016), Secret Number (2017)

Winners since 2000

 The 2001 winner Kings Boy was later exported to Saudi Arabia and renamed Qaayed Alkhail.

See also
 List of Turkish flat horse races

References

Racing Post:
 horseracingintfed.com – International Federation of Horseracing Authorities – International Bosphorus Cup (2017).

Open middle distance horse races
Horse races in Turkey